Jurij Macura (born December 23, 1999) is a Slovenian professional basketball player for Krka of the Slovenian League. He is a 2.11 m tall power forward and center.

Professional career 
On June 10, 2019, Macura signed for Serbian team Mega Bemax.

On August 8, 2020, Macura was loaned to Koper Primorska for the 2020–21 season. In December 2020, Koper Primorska was disqualified from the ABA League and disbanded. Afterwards, he joined Serbian team FMP for the rest of the season. 

On July 22, 2021, Macura signed with Krka of the Slovenian League.

National team career 
Macura made a debut for the Slovenia national team during the 2019 FIBA World Cup qualifications.

References

External links
 Eurobasket.com profile

1999 births
Living people
ABA League players
Centers (basketball)
KK FMP players
KK Mega Basket players
KK Krka players
Power forwards (basketball)
Saski Baskonia players
Slovenian expatriate basketball people in Serbia
Slovenian expatriate basketball people in Spain
Slovenian men's basketball players
Basketball players from Ljubljana